The women's 1500 metres race of the 2013–14 ISU Speed Skating World Cup 1, arranged in the Olympic Oval, in Calgary, Alberta, Canada, was held on 9 November 2013.

Lotte van Beek of the Netherlands won, while Ireen Wüst, also of the Netherlands, came second, and Martina Sáblíková of the Czech Republic came third. Heather Richardson of the United States won Division B.

Results
The race took place on Saturday, 9 November, with Division A scheduled in the morning session, at 12:19, and Division B scheduled in the afternoon session, at 17:26.

Division A

Division B

References

Women 1500
1